Francesco Caetani, 8th Duke of Sermoneta, (11 March 1613 – 9 October 1683) was an Italian nobleman.

Aged 15, he was led to Spain by his uncle, cardinal Antonio Caetani (iuniore), where he remained as royal page until 1616. He was  Governor of the Duchy of Milan from March 1660 to September 1662, and  Viceroy of Sicily from September 1662 to April 1667

References

External links
http://www.grandesp.org.uk/historia/gzas/tavara.htm

1613 births
1683 deaths
Francesco
Governors of the Duchy of Milan
Viceroys of Sicily
Dukes of Italy